Colossendeis belekurovi is a species  of sea spider (class Pycnogonida) belonging to the family Colossendeidae. The species was first described by Pushkin in 1993.

References

Pycnogonids
Animals described in 1993